Lyria mallicki is a species of sea snail, a marine gastropod mollusk in the family Volutidae, the volutes.

Subspecies
 Lyria mallicki jessicae Bail & Poppe, 2004 (occurs off the Philippines)

Description

Distribution
Philippines.

References

 Kosuge S. (1981) Studies on the collection of Mr. Victor Dan (4) Descriptions of new species of the genera Lyria, Conus and Fissidentalium. Bulletin of the Institute of Malacology, Tokyo 1(7): 113-115, pl. 39. 31
 Bail, P. & Poppe, G., 2004 The Tribe Lyriini. A revision of the Recent species of the genera Lyria, Callipara, Harpulina, Enaeta, and Leptoscapha, p. 93 pp, 68 pls

Volutidae
Gastropods described in 1975